Samuel Hunter Bennett (born June 20, 1996) is a Canadian professional ice hockey centre for the Florida Panthers of the National Hockey League (NHL). Bennett was rated by the NHL Central Scouting Bureau as the top North American prospect for the 2014 NHL Entry Draft, where he was selected fourth overall by the Calgary Flames. Bennett made his NHL debut in the 2014–15 season.

Playing career

Kingston Frontenacs
Bennett is a native of Holland Landing, Ontario. He played minor ice hockey for the York-Simcoe Express and then the Toronto Marlboros. He played in the 2009 Quebec International Pee-Wee Hockey Tournament as a member of York-Simcoe, and was a teammate of Connor McDavid. In 2012, he was selected ninth overall by the Kingston Frontenacs in the Ontario Hockey League (OHL) Priority Selection Draft. He appeared in 40 games with the Frontenacs in 2012–13 and recorded 40 points to earn a place on the OHL's Second All-Rookie Team.

Returning to the Frontenacs for the 2013–14 season, Bennett was among the OHL's scoring leaders by mid-season. He stood fourth with 66 points in 40 games and was on a 24-game scoring streak when he suffered a minor injury that prevented him from participating in the 2014 CHL Top Prospects Game. In its mid-season ranking, the NHL Central Scouting Bureau named Bennett as the top North American prospect for the 2014 NHL Entry Draft. One of the Bureau's scouts praised Bennett's offensive ability: "His puckhandling and playmaking are excellent and he has one of the best shots in this year's draft class. He has scored several goals from the high slot and coming in off the wing and has been very effective on the power play." Concerns were raised when at the 2014 NHL Scouting Combine, he was unable to do a single pull-up. He retained the top spot in NHL Central Scouting's final ranking after recording nine points in seven playoff games for Kingston despite playing through a groin injury. He finished the regular season with 36 goals and 91 points in 57 games. He was named to the OHL's Third All-Star Team.

The Calgary Flames selected Bennett with the fourth overall selection at the 2014 NHL Entry Draft, and he quickly signed a three-year, entry-level contract with the club. He attended the team's training camp prior to the 2014–15 season, where he injured his shoulder. Bennett admitted that the shoulder had ailed him the previous season in Kingston, but he initially failed to disclose the issue, stating he "wanted to play" and would "do anything to make the team and play in the NHL this year". Instead, Bennett's injury required surgery to repair, which the Flames said would prevent him from playing for several months. After missing five months of action, Bennett was medically cleared to play and was reassigned to Kingston on February 21, 2015. He scored 24 points in 11 regular season games for Kingston and added 3 assists as the Frontenacs were quickly eliminated in the OHL playoffs.

Calgary Flames
The Flames recalled Bennett to Calgary after Kingston's season ended, and he made his NHL debut in the team's final regular season game on April 12, against the Winnipeg Jets. He recorded his first career point on his first shift – 33 seconds into the contest – assisting on a Micheal Ferland goal in a 5–1 loss. Bennett was a regular player for the Flames in the 2015 Stanley Cup playoffs, and recorded his first NHL goal on April 19, a game-winner against Eddie Läck of the Vancouver Canucks in a 4–2 victory. Bennett played all 11 playoff games for the Flames, in which he scored three goals and added an assist. On January 13, 2016, Bennett scored four goals against the Florida Panthers. At 19 years and six months, he became the youngest player in Flames history to score a hat-trick, and the third-youngest player in NHL history to score four goals in a game. Bennett scored his first three goals within the first 17 minutes of the game, and added a fourth goal in the last minute of the third period.

On September 6, 2017, the Flames signed Bennett to a two-year, $3.9 million contract extension worth $1.95 million annually. On July 24, 2019, Bennett was re-signed to a two-year contract.

Florida Panthers
On April 12, 2021, Bennett, along with a sixth-round pick in 2022, was traded to the Florida Panthers in exchange for draft rights to Emil Heineman and a second-round pick in 2022.

On July 26, 2021, Bennett signed a four-year, $17.6 million contract extension with the Panthers.

International play

Bennett played for the Canadian under-18 national team in the 2013 World U18 Championship. He recorded three goals and four assists in seven games as Canada won the gold medal with a 3–2 victory over the United States in the final. He also played on the gold medal-winning Canadian team at the 2013 Ivan Hlinka Memorial Tournament.

Career statistics

Regular season and playoffs

International

Awards and honours

References

External links
 

1996 births
Living people
Calgary Flames draft picks
Calgary Flames players
Canadian ice hockey centres
Florida Panthers players
Ice hockey people from Ontario
Kingston Frontenacs players
National Hockey League first-round draft picks
People from East Gwillimbury